Octasphales stellifera is a moth in the family Depressariidae. It was described by Edward Meyrick in 1914. It is found in New Guinea.

The wingspan is about 23 mm. The forewings are light pinkish grey, strewn with suffused white dots arranged in longitudinal rows. The hindwings are grey.

References

Moths described in 1914
Octasphales